This is the discography for American jazz musician Benny Golson.

As leader 
 The Modern Touch (Riverside, 1958) – recorded in 1957
 The Other Side of Benny Golson (Riverside, 1958)
 Benny Golson and the Philadelphians (United Artists, 1958)
 Benny Golson's New York Scene (Contemporary, 1959) – recorded in 1957
 Gone with Golson (New Jazz, 1959)
 Groovin' with Golson (New Jazz, 1959)
 Gettin' with It (New Jazz, 1959)
 Winchester Special with Lem Winchester (New Jazz, 1959)
 Gettin' with It (New Jazz, 1960) – recorded in 1959
 Take a Number from 1 to 10 (Argo, 1961) – recorded in 1960-61
 Pop + Jazz = Swing (Audio Fidelity, 1962) – reconfigured and issued as Just Jazz! (1965)
 Turning Point (Mercury, 1962)
 Free (Argo, 1963) – recorded in 1962
 Stockholm Sojourn (Prestige, 1965) – recorded in 1964
 Tune In, Turn On (Verve, 1967)
 Are You Real (CBS/Sony, 1977)
 Killer Joe (Columbia, 1977)
 I'm Always Dancin' to the Music (Columbia, 1978)
 California Message with Curtis Fuller (Baystate, 1981) – recorded in 1980
 One More Mem'ry with Curtis Fuller (Baystate, 1982) – recorded in 1981
 Time Speaks with Freddie Hubbard and Woody Shaw  (Baystate, 1983) – recorded in 1982
 This Is for You, John (Baystate, 1984) – recorded in 1983
 Stardust with Freddie Hubbard (Denon, 1987)
 Benny Golson Quartet Live (Dreyfus, 1991) – live recorded in 1989
 Benny Golson Quartet (LRC Ltd., 1990) – also released as Up, Jumped, Spring (2002)
 Domingo with Curtis Fuller (Dreyfus, 1992) – recorded in 1991
 I Remember Miles (Alfa Jazz, 1993) – recorded in 1992
 That's Funky with Nat Adderley (Meldac Jazz, 1995) – recorded in 1994
 Three Little Words (Jazz House Records 609, 1997) – recorded live at Ronnie Scott's Jazz Club in 1965
 Up Jumped Benny (Arkadia Jazz, 1997) – live recorded in 1996
 Tenor Legacy (Arkadia Jazz, 1998) – recorded in 1996
 Remembering Clifford (Milestone, 1998) – recorded in 1997
 One Day, Forever (Arkadia Jazz, 2001) – recorded in 1996-2000
 Terminal 1 (Concord, 2004)
 The Masquerade Is Over (Azzurra Music, 2005)
 The Many Moods of Benny Golson (Arkadia Jazz, 2007)
 New Time, New 'Tet (Concord, 2009) – recorded in 2008
 Horizon Ahead (HighNote, 2016) – recorded in 2015

With the Jazztet 
 Meet the Jazztet (Argo, 1960)
 Big City Sounds (Argo, 1960)
 The Jazztet and John Lewis (Argo, 1961) – recorded in 1960-61
 The Jazztet at Birdhouse (Argo, 1961) – live
 Here and Now (Mercury, 1962)
 Another Git Together (Mercury, 1962)
 Voices All (East West, 1983) – recorded in 1982
 Moment to Moment (Soul Note, 1983)
 V.A., Playboy Jazz Festival (Elektra/Musician, 1984)[2LP] – compilation live recorded in 1982
 Back to the City (Contemporary, 1986) – live
 Nostalgia (Baystate, 1988) – recorded in 1983
 Real Time (Contemporary, 1988) – live recorded in 1986

As arranger 
With Kenny Burrell
 Both Feet on the Ground (Fantasy, 1973)

With Jimmy Cleveland 
 Rhythm Crazy (EmArcy, 1964) – recorded in 1959. also as a performer.

With Art Farmer
 Brass Shout (United Artists, 1959)
 Baroque Sketches (Columbia, 1967) – recorded in 1966

With Curtis Fuller
 Sliding Easy (United Artists, 1959)

With Red Holloway
 Sax, Strings & Soul (Prestige, 1964)

With Roland Kirk
 The Roland Kirk Quartet Meets the Benny Golson Orchestra (Mercury, 1963)

With Illinois Jacquet
 Bosses of the Ballad (Argo, 1964)

With Jack McDuff
 Prelude (Prestige, 1964) – recorded in 1963
 The Dynamic Jack McDuff (Prestige, 1964)
 Walk On By (Prestige, 1966)
 The Midnight Sun (Prestige, 1969) – recorded in 1964-66
 Steppin' Out (Prestige, 1969) – recorded in 1961-66

With Freda Payne
 How Do You Say I Don't Love You Anymore (MGM, 1966)

With Jerome Richardson
 Groove Merchant (Verve, 1968) – recorded in 1967

With Sahib Shihab
 Jazz Sahib (Savoy, 1957)

With Jimmy Witherspoon
 Some of My Best Friends Are the Blues (Prestige, 1964)

As sideman 

With Art Blakey
 1958 - Paris Olympia (Fontana, 1958) – live
 Des Femmes Disparaissent (Fontana, 1958) – soundtrack
 Moanin' (Blue Note, 1959) – recorded in 1958

With Curtis Fuller
 The Curtis Fuller Jazztet (Savoy, 1959)
 Blues-ette (Savoy, 1960) – recorded in 1959
 Imagination (Savoy1960) – recorded in 1959
 Blues-ette Part II (Savoy, 1993)

With Dizzy Gillespie
 Dizzy in Greece (Verve, 1957) – recorded in 1956–57
 Birks' Works (Verve, 1957)
 Dizzy Gillespie at Newport (Verve, 1957)
 The Greatest Trumpet of Them All (Verve, 1957)
 Bird Songs: The Final Recordings (Telarc, 1992)
 To Bird with Love (Telarc, 1992)

With Quincy Jones
 The Birth of a Band! (Mercury, 1959)
 I/We Had a Ball (Limelight, 1965) – recorded in 1964-65

With John Lewis
 The Wonderful World of Jazz (Atlantic, 1961) – recorded in 1960
 Essence (Atlantic, 1965) – recorded in 1960-62

With others
 Ahmed Abdul-Malik, East Meets West (RCA Victor, 1960) – recorded in 1959
 Arkadia Jazz All Stars, Thank You, Duke! (Arkadia Jazz, 1999)
 Ron Carter, Stardust (Somethin' Else, 2001)
 Jimmy Cleveland, Cleveland Style (EmArcy, 1958) – recorded in 1957
 Cass Elliot, Cass Elliot (RCA, 1972) – recorded in 1971
 Art Farmer, Modern Art (United Artists, 1958)
 Ernie Henry, Last Chorus (Riverside, 1958) – recorded in 1956–57
 Milt Jackson, Bags' Opus (United Artists, 1959) – recorded in 1958
 Philly Joe Jones, Drums Around the World (Riverside, 1959)
 Abbey Lincoln, It's Magic (Riverside, 1958)
 Blue Mitchell, Out of the Blue (Riverside, 1959)
 Lee Morgan, Lee Morgan Vol. 3 (Blue Note, 1957)
 Oscar Pettiford, The Oscar Pettiford Orchestra in Hi-Fi Volume Two (ABC-Paramount, 1957) – also composer and arranger
 Sarah Vaughan, Sassy Swings Again (Mercury, 1967)
 Meeco, Beauty of the Night (Connector, 2012)[2CD] – recorded in 2011
 Gail Davies, Since I Don't Have You (Little Chickadee, 2014)

References 

Discographies of American artists
Jazz discographies